Hinduism in Panama is a minority religion. There are about 14,000 (0.32%) Hindus in Panama as of 2021.

History
The Hindus initially arrived by way of the British colonies of Guyana and Trinidad-Tobago, first came as canal workers between 1904 and 1913. Most of the Hindus trace their 
roots back to the states of Gujarat and Sindh, in India and Pakistan respectively.

Demographics

Hindu Associations and Organisations
The main association of Hindus in Panama are the Panamanian Hindu Civic Association, the Krishna Radha Temple Society, the Hindustani 
Society of Panama (Templo Hindu de Tumba Muerto), the Hindustani Society of Colón. The International Society for Krishna Consciousness, 
International Sri Sathya Sai Baba Organization, and International Society of Transcendental 
Meditation are also present in Panama.

Panama Hindu Temple

Panama Hindu Temple is one of only two Hindu Temples in Panama, and stands on top of a hill in
Tumba Muerto.

See also
Indians in Panama
Hinduism in Suriname
Hinduism in Trinidad and Tobago
Hinduism in French Guiana

References

Panama
Religion in Panama